The Chunichi Dragons are a professional baseball team based in Nagoya, Aichi, Japan. The Dragons are members of the Central League (CL) in Nippon Professional Baseball (NPB). In baseball, the head coach of a team is called the manager, or more formally, the field manager. The duties of the team manager include team strategy and leadership on and off the field.

Since their inception as Nagoya Club in 1936, the Dragons have employed 30 managers.

As one of the founding members of the NPB, the team has employed 30 managers (including four on an interim basis only), winning two Japan Series titles and eight Central League pennants. The franchise's first manager was hall of famer, Yutaka Ikeda, who managed the team for one year and who won 19 games in 42 attempts. Chunichi's most successful season  came under another hall of famer, Shunichi Amachi, who led the team to Central league victory in 1954 with a winning percentage of .683 to claim the team's first Central League and Japan Series crowns. He was the first manager with no professional baseball experience to do so in Japan. It took another 53 years for Chunichi to win its second Japan series in 2007, under the coaching of long-term manager Hiromitsu Ochiai. Ochiai would prove to be the Dragons' most successful manager, with four Central League pennants to go with his Japan Series win.

Former Chunichi ace pitcher and Eiji Sawamura Award winner Senichi Hoshino is the longest serving Dragons' manager, having had two stints with the team for an accumulated 11 years in the hot seat. He led the Dragons to the Central League pennant twice, in 1988 and 1999.

Long serving catcher and NPB appearance record holder Motonobu Tanishige became manager of the Dragons while still playing professionally in 2013. He retired in 2015 to focus on managing the team. Tanishige however was relieved of his post following a series of disappointing results on the 9th of August, 2016 with head coach Shigekazu Mori taking control of the team as interim manager and eventually as full-time manager.

Hall of famer and NPB doubles leader, Kazuyoshi Tatsunami is the current manager.

Table key

Managers 
Statistics current through the 2022 season

References
General

Specific

Lists of Nippon Professional Baseball managers